The Cuckold Formation is a stratigraphic unit of the Ediacaran Signal Hill Group, cropping out on eastern Newfoundland; it comprises red conglomerates and sandstones.

References

Ediacaran Newfoundland and Labrador